James Webster Sorrie (31 December 1885 — 31 July 1955) was a Scottish first-class cricketer and solicitor.

Sorrie was born in December 1885 at Brechin. He later studied law at the University of Edinburgh. A club cricketer for Brechin Cricket Club and later Carlton Cricket Club, he made his debut in first-class cricket for Scotland against the touring South Africans at Edinburgh in 1912. Sorrie was a regular feature in the Scottish side prior to the First World War, playing in seven matches; three came in the annual match against Ireland, while his other appearances came against Surrey, Oxford University, and the touring Australians. Following the war, he made a further two appearances in first-class cricket for Scotland, playing against Ireland in 1920 and Wales in 1924. In nine first-class matches, Sorrie scored 346 runs at an average of 19.22; he made two half centuries, with a highest score of 61 against Surrey at The Oval.

Outside of cricket, Sorrie worked as a solicitor for the firm Messrs Macandrew, Wright & Murray in Edinburgh. He died in England at Blackpool in July 1955.

References

External links
 

1885 births
1955 deaths
People from Brechin
Alumni of the University of Edinburgh
Scottish cricketers
Scottish solicitors